Henry T. "Hank" Greely is an American lawyer currently the Deane F. and Kate Edelman Johnson Professor of Law at Stanford Law School and is an Elected Fellow of the American Association for the Advancement of Science.

References

Stanford University faculty
American lawyers
Living people
Yale University alumni
Stanford University alumni
Year of birth missing (living people)
American Association for the Advancement of Science
Bioethicists